The 1962–63 season was the 79th football season in which Dumbarton competed at a Scottish national level, entering the Scottish Football League, the Scottish Cup and the Scottish League Cup.  In addition Dumbarton competed in the Stirlingshire Cup.

Scottish Second Division

After the previous season's disappointments, Dumbarton were having similar problems in the league until a run of five victories at the end of the campaign improved the team's position to finish in a creditable 12th place with 34 points, 21 behind champions St Johnstone.

Scottish League Cup

The League Cup was to prove the bright spot of the season, and after 3 wins and a draw from their sectional ties, and a subsequent play off win over Cowdenbeath, Dumbarton were to lose a close quarter final encounter against Rangers, the highlight being a 1-1 draw at Ibrox.

Scottish Cup

In the Scottish Cup, Dumbarton fell at the first hurdle for the fourth consecutive season, losing to Arbroath.

Stirlingshire Cup
Dumbarton lost out to Falkirk in the first round of the county Cup.

Friendly

Player statistics

Squad 

|}

Source:

Transfers
Amongst those players joining and leaving the club were the following:

Players in

Players out 

Source:

Reserve team
For the second year running, Dumbarton played a team in the Combined Reserve League, finishing 3rd of 7, winning 10 and drawing 8 from 24 matches.  In the Scottish Second XI Cup, Dumbarton lost in the first round to Queens Park, after a draw.

References

Dumbarton F.C. seasons
Scottish football clubs 1962–63 season